Anthony Akhakon "Tony" Anenih (4 August 1933 – 28 October 2018) was a Nigerian politician who was appointed Minister of Works and Housing in 1999.

Background
Anenih was born in Uzenema-Arue in Uromi. In 1933, he joined the Nigeria Police Force in Benin City. Working at home, he obtained secondary school qualifications. He attended the police college in Ikeja, and was selected for further training in the Bramshill Police College, Basingstoke, England in 1966 and the International Police Academy, Washington DC in 1970.
He served as a police orderly to the first Governor General of Nigeria, Dr. Nnamdi Azikiwe.
He worked as an instructor in various police colleges, and in 1975 was assigned to the Administrative Staff College (ASCON), Lagos. 
He retired from the police as a Commissioner of police.

Early political career
Anenih was State Chairman of the National Party of Nigeria (NPN) between 1981 and 1983, helping Dr. Samuel Ogbemudia become elected as civilian Governor of Bendel State. However, the governorship was cut short by the military takeover of December 1983.
He was National Chairman of the Social Democratic Party from 1992 to 1993, when he assisted in the election of Chief M. K. O. Abiola as president. He was a member of the Constitutional Conference in 1994.

Anenih was a member of the Peoples Democratic Movement (PDM), United Nigeria Congress Party (UNCP) and People's Democratic Party (PDP). Anenih was said to have masterminded the 26 April 2002 declaration of President Obasanjo at the International Conference center Abuja.
He was deputy national coordinator of Olusegun Obasanjo's campaign Organisation in the 1999 and 2003 elections.

Minister of Works and Housing

Chief Anenih was appointed Minister of Works and Housing in 1999. He subsequently became Chairman of the Board of Trustees of the PDP.

Controversies

In October 2009, a senate committee issued a report on their investigation into the use of more than N300 billion in the transport sector during the Obasanjo administration. The committee recommended prosecution of thirteen former Ministers, including Anenih, saying he had awarded contracts without budgetary provision. 
In November 2009, the Senate indefinitely shelved consideration of the report.

In October 2009, the Central Bank of Nigeria released a list of customers with major debt to five recently audited banks. It reported that, through Mettle Energy and Gas limited, Chief Tony Anenih and Osahon Asemota owed N2,065 million.
Anenih said he had nothing to do with Mettle Energy and Gas Limited, and said he had written to the Economic and Financial Crimes Commission (EFCC) Chairman, Farida Waziri, urging the commission to investigate the matter.

Personal life

He was married to Josephine Anenih, a lawyer, who was the chairperson of the Federation of Women Lawyers from 1994 to 2000. She was appointed minister of Women Affairs on 6 April 2010, when Acting President Goodluck Jonathan announced his new cabinet.

Death
Anenih died on 28 October 2018, and was buried in his hometown in Uromi, his burial was attended by many influential people in the country. Until his death, he was the Iyasele of Esan Land .

References

1933 births
2018 deaths
Nigerian Roman Catholics
National Party of Nigeria politicians
Social Democratic Party (Nigeria) politicians
Peoples Democratic Party (Nigeria) politicians
Federal ministers of Nigeria
People from Edo State